Lytham railway station serves the town of Lytham St Annes, Lancashire on the Blackpool South to Preston railway line.

Services
The conurbation of Lytham St Annes is served by three stations: Lytham,  (adjacent to the Royal Lytham & St Annes Golf Club) and St Annes. Northern runs trains from here to Blackpool South and to Kirkham,  and  once an hour all week (including Sundays); these services are much less frequent than those to Blackpool North. Services are usually worked by Class 150 Diesel Multiple Units.

History
The road name Station Road attests to the fact that the original station was about 500 metres east of the present one; a fire station now stands on the spot. The present station in Ballam Road was opened in 1863 when the separate Blackpool and Lytham Railway opened. The Ballam road station was originally a terminus, until 1874 when it was rebuilt and the Blackpool line was extended to join the Kirkham line, at which time the Station Road station closed to passengers.

On 4 November 1924, an express passenger train was derailed due to a broken tyre on the locomotive. Fourteen people were killed. The station was host to five LMS caravans in 1935, eight from 1936 to 1938 and thirteen in 1939.

The station ceased to be staffed after the cut-backs of the 1960s and the station building became derelict. In 1986 it was restored and transformed into a public house, the Station Tavern. At around the same time, the derelict sidings area was flattened and turned into a long-stay car park.

Facilities
As noted the station is now unstaffed and has only basic facilities (waiting shelters, cycle stand and bench seating).  It has though been provided with a self-service ticket machine and PIS screen like other stations on the line.  Train information can also be obtained from timetable posters and a payphone.  Level access to the platform is available from the car park. A pub nearby named ‘The Station’ is well known to locals alike.

References

Notes

Sources
 
 Welch, M.S. (2004) Lancashire Steam Finale, Runpast Publishing, Cheltenham, p. 29.

External links

Lytham St Annes
Railway stations in the Borough of Fylde
DfT Category F2 stations
Former Preston and Wyre Joint Railway stations
Railway stations in Great Britain opened in 1863
Northern franchise railway stations
1863 establishments in England